Zdravitsa, Op. 85, is a cantata written by Sergei Prokofiev in 1939 to celebrate Stalin's 60th birthday. Its title is sometimes translated as Hail to Stalin in English. A performance lasts around thirteen minutes.

Background

After Prokofiev returned to the Soviet Union, he was viewed as a suspect in the eyes of the Stalinist regime and was under scrutiny. Numerous Soviet artists had already been arrested or even executed for creating art that was deemed too 'formalistic' by Soviet officials. Indeed, when Prokofiev collaborated with theatre director Vsevolod Meyerhold for his opera Semyon Kotko, the opera's premiere was postponed due to Meyerhold being arrested on 20 June 1939. Meyerhold was executed on 2 February 1940. In October 1939, Prokofiev was invited to write Zdravitsa for the approaching celebrations of Stalin's 60th birthday on 21 December.

Foreigners were unaware that his first wife, Lina, and their two sons were being held in Siberia as hostages for his compliance.

Libretto

The libretto, which according to the first edition was taken from "Russian, Ukrainian, Belorussian, Kumïk, Kurd, Mari, and Mordovian sources", is a patchwork of poems taken from a 534-page pseudo-folkloristic collection celebrating the 20th anniversary of the October Revolution. The fabricated contents were ostensibly the work of ordinary citizens from the USSR's many regions and ethnic groups. The anonymous government writers' attempts to imitate folk byliny are done in a clumsy and blundering manner. The selection was made by officials of the Radio Committee, which Prokofiev then reordered and edited. Using previously published texts obviated the need for official approval which new ones would have required and prevented a repeat of the damaging fiasco that had occurred when the Cantata for the 20th Anniversary of the October Revolution had to be rewritten after Prokofiev had produced his own libretto without official guidance.

Analysis

Simon Morrison notes that "in explicit contrast to the reality of mass incarceration, starvation, and execution, [Zdravitsa and similar propaganda works] offer benign images of resplendent harvests and harmonious labor". The cantata opens with a sighing motif on trumpets, after which the strings play an expansive, flowing melody in C major. The choir suddenly enters, and the music picks up speed. The choir slips cheekily into distant keys now and then, but the harmonic language contains nothing too 'unorthodox' which would have been anathema to Soviet musical strictures. Faster staccato sections continue to alternate with slower flowing sections.

Of special interest is the penultimate section, where the choir races up and down a C major scale (spanning more than two octaves), rather like a child practising piano scales: the British journalist, Alexander Werth (author of Musical Uproar in Moscow), "wondered whether [Prokofiev] hadn't just the tip of his tongue in his cheek as he made the good simple kolkhozniks sing a plain C-major scale, up and down, up and down, and up and down again...". The orchestra provides alternating G and A-flat pedal notes. The cantata ends in a blazing C major, a favourite key of Prokofiev (cf. Piano Concerto No. 3, Russian Overture, and Symphony No. 4), while the choir sings, "You are the banner flying from our mighty fortress! You are the flame that warms our spirit and our blood, O Stalin, Stalin!"

Sviatoslav Richter, in Bruno Monsaingeon's documentary, criticizes the "brutal" Prokofiev for working on commission "without principles" and calls Zdravitsa unplayable today due to its subject matter, but, nevertheless, an "absolute work of genius".

Performance history
The cantata premiered on 21 December 1939 in Moscow, conducted by Nikolai Golovanov. It was broadcast twice in 1952. After de-Stalinization, the text, like many others, was rewritten to remove references to the now partially disgraced Stalin. In the editions of 1970 and 1984, the toast becomes a toast to the Communist Party of the Soviet Union.

Text and translation

Instrumentation
The cantata is scored for piccolo, 2 flutes, 2 oboes, English horn, 2 clarinets, bass clarinet, 2 bassoons, contrabassoon, 4 horns, 3 trumpets, 3 trombones, tuba, timpani, percussion (woodblocks, snare drum, tambourine, triangle, cymbals, bass drum, tam-tam, xylophone, tubular bells), harp, piano, strings, and a choir.

Recordings

Notes

References
Jaffé, Daniel Sergey Prokofiev (London: Phaidon, 1998; rev. 2008)
Werth, Alexander The Year of Stalingrad (London: Hamish Hamilton, 1946)

External links
Recording of Zdravitsa, Valeri Polyanski (conductor) and the Russian State Symphonic Orchestra, Russian State Symphonic Capella.

Cantatas by Sergei Prokofiev
1939 compositions
Compositions in C major